Fuli could refer to the following locations:

China
Fuli or Central Region within the Yuan dynasty directly governed by the Zhongshu Sheng
, a subdistrict in Nanshan District, Hegang, Heilongjiang
Fuli, Fuchuan County, a town in Fuchuan Yao Autonomous County, Hezhou, Guangxi
, a town in Jixian County, Shuangyashan, Heilongjiang
Fuli, Liling, a town in Liling, Zhuzhou, Hunan
, a town in Yongqiao District, Suzhou, Anhui
Fuli, Yangshuo County, a town in Yangshuo County, Guilin, Guangxi

Taiwan
Fuli, Hualien (）, a rural township located in southern Hualien County